The 1930 European Wrestling Championships were held in  the men's Freestyle style  in Brussels 8 – 10 May 1930; the Greco-Romane style and  in Stockholm 1 – 3 March 1930.

Medal table

Medal summary

Men's freestyle

Men's Greco-Roman

References

External links 
FILA Database

1930 in European sport
Sports competitions in Sweden
Sports competitions in Belgium